Jarren Williams may refer to:

Jarren Williams (quarterback), American football player
Jarren Williams (defensive back) (born 1997), American football player

See also
 Jerre Stockton Williams (1916–1993), United States Circuit Judge